The 1919 Marion Cadets football team was an American football team that represented the Marion Military Institute as an independent during the 1919 college football season. The in their fourth season under head coach Blandy Clarkson, the Cadets compiled an overall record of 3–6. Coach Clarkson left Marion in February 1920 to become head coach at VMI.

Schedule

References

Marion
Marion Cadets football seasons
Marion Cadets football